Massimo de Bertolis (born 28 April 1975) is an Italian former professional cross-country mountain biker. He most notably won the 2004 UCI Mountain Bike Marathon World Championships in Bad Goisern, Austria.

He also won the first round of the 2005 UCI XCM World Cup and finished 5th overall. In the 2007 edition, he won the second round in Villabassa and this time finished second overall.

References

External links

1975 births
Living people
Italian male cyclists
Italian mountain bikers
UCI Mountain Bike World Champions (men)
People from Feltre
Cyclists from the Province of Belluno
21st-century Italian people